Nicolò Palazzolo (born 29 November 1994) is an Italian professional footballer who plays as a midfielder for  club Piacenza.

Club career
On 13 July 2022, Palazzollo signed a two-year contract with Piacenza.

References

External links

1994 births
Living people
Footballers from Turin
Italian footballers
Association football midfielders
Serie C players
Serie D players
Juventus F.C. players
F.C. Canavese players
A.C. Cuneo 1905 players
A.S.D. Barletta 1922 players
S.S.D. Varese Calcio players
A.C. Gozzano players
A.S. Giana Erminio players
Piacenza Calcio 1919 players